Robert Blazekovic (born May 26, 1960) is an American former professional tennis player.

Blazekovic grew up in Battle Creek, Michigan and attended Springfield High School, where he won two state titles in singles. On the professional tour, Blazekovic attained a best singles world ranking of 273. In 1985 he qualified for the main draw of the Volvo International in Stratton Mountain was beaten by Jimmy Connors in the first round.

References

External links
 
 

1960 births
Living people
American male tennis players
Tennis people from Michigan
Sportspeople from Battle Creek, Michigan